The Bacolet Formation is a geologic formation in Trinidad and Tobago. It preserves radiolaria and ammonite fossils dating back to the Albian period. The formation is part of the Tobago Volcanic Group and comprises organic-rich, black pyritic siliceous mudstones and fine-grained volcaniclastic sandstones and siltstones.

See also 
 List of fossiliferous stratigraphic units in Trinidad and Tobago

References

Further reading 
 A. W. Snoke and P.J. Noble. 2001. Ammonite-radiolarian assemblage, Tobago Volcanic Group, Tobago, West Indies—Implications for the evolution of the Great Arc of the Caribbean. Geological Society America Bulletin 113:256-264

Geologic formations of Trinidad and Tobago
Cretaceous Trinidad and Tobago
Albian Stage
Shale formations
Source rock formations
Formations